DE23 may refer to:
 Delaware Route 23
 ROCS Tai Ho (DE-23)
 
 DE23, a postcode district in Derby, England; see DE postcode area